Alain Baumann (born 12 March 1966) is a retired Swiss football midfielder.

Honours
Swiss Super League:
Winner: 1985–86
Swiss Super Cup:
Winner: 1986
Swiss Cup:
Winner: 1986–87

References

1966 births
Living people
Swiss men's footballers
BSC Young Boys players
FC Thun players
Association football midfielders
Swiss Super League players
People from Bern-Mittelland District
Sportspeople from the canton of Bern